Squamanita granulifera is a species of fungus in the family Tricholomataceae. It is found in the Amazonian region of Ecuador, where it grows on the rotting wood of rotten wood of dicotyledons. The fungus was described as new to science in 1999 by mycologists Cornelis Bas and Thomas Læssøe.

References

External links

Fungi described in 1999
Fungi of Ecuador
Tricholomataceae